Chaufour-Notre-Dame is a commune in the Sarthe department in the Pays de la Loire region in north-western France.

It is located on the D357, 10 km west of Le Mans.

See also
Communes of the Sarthe department

References

Communes of Sarthe